Kathy Lewis is an artist living in Southern California, who received recognition with rubber stamps, and her collection of over 15,000 stamps. Additionally, Lewis was a math teacher at Cal State Fullerton, a mother of 3, and taught stamp classes at Stampa Barbara.

References

Living people
Artists from California
Year of birth missing (living people)
American women artists